Origin Pacific Airways was an airline based in Nelson in New Zealand. Its main base was at Nelson Airport (NSN). It ceased passenger operations on 10 August 2006,  and its residual freight operations on 15 September 2006.

History

Starting out 

Origin Pacific Airways was established by |Robert Inglis and Nicki Smith in 1996 and started operations in April 1997. Inglis and Smith had previously established Air Nelson which they subsequently sold to Air New Zealand. Mike Pero and a group of Wellington investors each also owned 25% shares in the company.

Code-share with Qantas Jetconnect 

Origin operated code-share flights on behalf of Jetconnect (a subsidiary of Qantas) from mid 2001 to early 2004. When the code-share agreement was cancelled the airline lost around 60% of its business. Routes served on behalf of Jetconnect included Rotorua and Queenstown. Origin operated ATR-72-212 and Dash 8 100 and 300 aircraft on those routes. Jetconnect took over these routes using their own Boeing 737 aircraft.

The loss of the code-share with Jetconnect was a major blow to the airline. They lost access to Qantas's international network and had to compete against the government backed Air New Zealand and with a competing Jetconnect. The code-share loss thus resulted in the scaling back of jobs and aircraft.

Collapse 

The airline ceased passenger operations on 10 August 2006 when the airline could not service its debts to airports and to Inland Revenue. At the time the airline ceased passenger operations, Origin's passenger numbers were up more than usual.  Freight operations finished on 15 September 2006.

Destinations

Prior to the suspension of domestic passenger services, the airline (as at January 2005) operated services to the following scheduled destinations:

Fleet
During its operation Origin Pacific operated the following aircraft:

4 BAe Jetstream 31
3 BAe Jetstream 32
5 BAe Jetstream 41
1 Cessna 421
2 ATR-72-212
3 DHC-8-100
2 DHC-8-300
1 Fairchild-Swearingen Metroliner III
3 Fairchild-Swearingen Metroliner 23

See also
 List of defunct airlines of New Zealand
 History of aviation in New Zealand

References

External links

Details on AviationPage New Zealand

Defunct airlines of New Zealand
Airlines established in 1996
Airlines disestablished in 2006
2006 disestablishments in New Zealand
New Zealand companies established in 1996